Emil Åberg (born 8 May 1992) is a Swedish footballer who plays for Eskilsminne IF as a forward.

Club career

Helsingborgs IF
Åberg made his league debut for Helsingborgs as a substitute in the 2011/12 season. In the same season he made his first appearance in European competition, coming on for the final minute of the 3–0 win over Bnei Yehuda in the Europa League.

References

External links
 
 
 
 
 
 

Helsingborgs IF players
1992 births
Living people
Association football forwards
Swedish men's footballers